"My Heart Wants Me Dead" is a song by Swedish singer Lisa Ajax. The song was released in Sweden as a digital download on 28 February 2016, and was written by Anton Hård af Segerstad, Linnea Deb, Joy Deb, Nikki Flores, and Sara Forsberg. It took part in Melodifestivalen 2016, and qualified to the final from the third semi-final. It placed seventh in the final.

Track listing

Chart performance

Release history

References

2015 songs
2016 singles
Capitol Records singles
Lisa Ajax songs
Melodifestivalen songs of 2016
Songs written by Anton Hård af Segerstad
Songs written by Linnea Deb
Songs written by Joy Deb
Songs written by Nikki Flores
Songs written by Sara Forsberg
English-language Swedish songs